Benicia station is a former train station in Benicia, California. It was added to the National Register of Historic Places in 2017 as Benicia Southern Pacific Railroad Passenger Depot.

History

The station building was constructed in 1897 for the town of Banta, California. It was built to Southern Pacific standard design No. 18. The Southern Pacific moved the building to Benicia in 1902 to serve the town and the ferries crossing of the Carquinez Strait, the Solano and Contra Costa. Services greatly declined after 1930 and the opening of the Benicia–Martinez Bridge, which rendered the ferry transfer unnecessary. The depot housed the station agent and their family until 1958. It was sold to the City of Benicia in 1974 and rehabilitated between 1999 and 2001.

It was added to the National Register of Historic Places on September 28, 2017.

See also
Saint Helena Southern Pacific Railroad Depot — another SP depot built to the same design in California

References

External links

Benicia Main Street — headquartered in the depot

Benicia, California
Railway stations in Solano County, California
Railway stations in the United States opened in 1897
Railway stations in the United States opened in 1902
Former Southern Pacific Railroad stations in California
National Register of Historic Places in Solano County, California
Railway stations on the National Register of Historic Places in California